Joseph Michael Hogan (August 10, 1937 – October 17, 2014) was an American politician and a Democratic member of the Nevada Assembly representing District 10 from February 1, 2005 until his death on October 17, 2014.

Education
Hogan earned his BS in business administration from the University of Notre Dame and his JD from Georgetown University.

Death
On October 17, 2014, Hogan died of a stroke at the age of 77, in Virginia. He also was in early stages of Alzheimer's disease and had intended to retire from the legislature.

Elections
2004 When Democratic Assemblyman David Goldwater retired and left the District 10 seat open, Hogan won the 2004 Democratic Primary with 1,114 votes (68.22%), and won the November 2, 2004 General election with 7,873 votes (54.75%) against Republican nominee Rex Wilhoite and Independent American candidate Glenn Brown.
2006 Hogan was unopposed for the August 15, 2006 Democratic Primary and won the November 7, 2006 General election with 4,468 votes (53.21%) against Republican nominee Jonathan Ozark and Independent American candidate Nicholas Hansen.
2008 Hogan was unopposed for the August 12, 2008 Democratic Primary and won the November 4, 2008 General election with 9,154 votes (64.14%) against Republican nominee Mitch Hostmeyer.
2010 Hogan was unopposed for the June 8, 2010 Democratic Primary and won the three-way November 2, 2010 General election with 5,330 votes (54.12%) against Republican nominee Tyler Andrews and Libertarian candidate Steve Lenores.
2012 Hogan won the June 12, 2012 Democratic Primary with 908 votes (61.85%), and won the November 6, 2012 General election with 10,558 votes (64.02%) against Republican nominee Tim Farrell.

References

External links
Official page at the Nevada Legislature
 

1937 births
2014 deaths
Georgetown University alumni
Democratic Party members of the Nevada Assembly
Politicians from Fort Dodge, Iowa
People from the Las Vegas Valley
United States Navy officers
University of Notre Dame alumni
Military personnel from Iowa